Endless Horizons is a 1953 French drama film directed by Jean Dréville. It was entered into the 1953 Cannes Film Festival.

Cast
 Giselle Pascal as Hélène Boucher
 Jean Chevrier as André Danet
 Paul Frankeur as Soupape
 Marie-France Planeze as Geneviève Gaudin
 René Blancard as René Gaudin
 Maurice Ronet as Marc Caussade
 Hubert de Malet as Brunel
 Christiane Barry as Jacqueline
 Jacques Bernard as Pigeon
 Lisette Lebon as Jacquotte
 Pierre Trabaud as Pierre Castel
 Marcel André as Dusmesnil
 Micheline Gary
 Guy Derlan as Fougères
 François Joux as 1er actionnaire

References

External links

1953 films
1953 drama films
1950s biographical drama films
French biographical drama films
1950s French-language films
Films directed by Jean Dréville
French aviation films
French black-and-white films
Films set in 1932
Films set in 1933
Films set in 1934
Biographical films about aviators
1950s French films